Kaiveni is a Maldivian romantic drama television mini-series developed for Television Maldives by Abdul Faththaah. The series stars Mariyam Zuhura, Ali Azim, Neena Saleem and Yooshau Jameel in pivotal roles. The series was aired on 3 August 2012 on the occasion of 1433 Ramadan.

Cast 
 Mariyam Zuhura as Firasha
 Ali Azim as Nawal
 Neena Saleem as Zahidha
 Yooshau Jameel as Rashad
 Mohamed Rifshan as Rifshan
 Roanu Hassan Manik as Firasha's father
 Noorannahaaru as Shafiya; Firasha's mother
 Aishath Rasheedha as Husna; Zahidha's friend
 Ahmed Ziya as Assad; Nawal's friend

Episodes

Soundtrack

References

Serial drama television series
Maldivian television shows